Primal Fear may refer to:

 Primal Fear (band), a German power metal band
 Primal Fear (album), their debut album
 Primal Fear (novel), a 1993 thriller novel by William Diehl
 Primal Fear (film), a 1996 film based on Diehl's novel